The Neales River is a watercourse located in the Far North region of the Australian state of South Australia.

The river is a tributary of Lake Eyre. The Central Australia Railway, on which The Ghan passenger train operated until 1980, crossed the Neales River floodplain over Algebuckina Bridge.

Neales River was named by explorer John McDouall Stuart after businessman and politician John Bentham Neales.

See also

References

Rivers of South Australia
Lake Eyre basin
Far North (South Australia)